Jacques Louis Nyst (1942 – 12 March 1996) was a Belgian video artist and educator.

He was born in Liège and studied at the Academy of Fine Arts in Madrid and in Liège. He was a professor of drawing and video at the Academy of Fine Arts in Liège. Nyst worked in collaboration with his wife Danièle from 1983 to 1995.

He died in Sprimont in 1996.

References 

1942 births
1996 deaths
Belgian video artists